The Samsung Galaxy A9 Pro (2016) (stylized as SAMSUNG Galaxy A9 Pro6) is an Android smartphone produced by Samsung Electronics. It was introduced in March 2016.

The Samsung Galaxy A9 Pro (2016) runs Android 6.0 "Marshmallow". The difference between the Samsung Galaxy A9 (2016) and the Pro version is that the A9 (2016) has 3GB of RAM and a 4000mAh battery while A9 Pro (2016) has 4 GB of RAM and a 5000mAh battery. Also, A9 Pro is equipped with a 16 MP rear camera while the A9 (2016) has a 13 MP rear camera.

Specifications

Design 
Samsung Galaxy A9 Pro (2016) has glass rear panel and aluminium frame. Both of the front glass and rear panel are protected by Corning Gorilla Glass 4. It measures 161.7 x 80.9 x 7.9 mm (Height x Width x Thickness) and weighs 210 grams. It was available with black, white and gold color options.

Hardware 
The device is powered by Qualcomm Snapdragon 652 with a octa-core processor with 28 nm fabrication process and 4x 1.8 Ghz Cortex-A72 + 4x 1.4 Ghz Cortex-A53 cores and Adreno 510 GPU. The device has 4 GB RAM, 32 GB eMMC 5.1 internal storage that can be expanded by microSDXC card slot, 16 MP rear camera with f/1.9 aperture, 8 MP selfie camera with f/1.9 aperture, 6.0 inch Super AMOLED Full HD (1080x1920 pixels) display and 5000 mAh non-removable Li-Ion battery.

Camera 
The device has a 16 MP rear camera with f/1.9 aperture, 1/2.8" sensor size, autofocus (AF) and optical image stabilization (OIS). It has an 8 MP selfie camera with f/1.9 aperture. Both of the cameras support 1080p video recording at 30 fps.

Software 
The device comes Android 6.0.1 Marshmallow preinstalled. It received Android 7.0 Nougat update in 2017. It is upgradable to Android 8.0 Oreo with Samsung Experience 9.0 user interface.

References

Android (operating system) devices
Samsung Galaxy
Samsung smartphones
Mobile phones introduced in 2016
Discontinued smartphones